is the 1st studio album by the Japanese pop group T-Pistonz+KMC. It was released on December 22, 2010.

Track listing

References

External links 
 OFFICIAL WEBSITE - Discography (in Japanese)
 がんばリーヨ！ - UP-FRONT WORKS (in Japanese)
 がんばリーヨ！ - Oricon (in Japanese)

Inazuma Eleven
2010 albums